Shankar Viman Mandapam is a Hindu temple in Prayagraj, Uttar Pradesh, India and is dedicated to the Hindu God Shiva. Located north of the famous Triveni Sangam on the right banks of river Ganga, this four story temple is built in memory of Adi Shankaracharya. Architecture style is South Indian Vimana style.

References

Tourist attractions in Allahabad
Buildings and structures in Allahabad
Shiva temples in Uttar Pradesh